Nguyễn Ngọc Nguyên (born 7 July 1987) is a Vietnamese footballer who plays as a defender for V-League club SHB Đà Nẵng F.C.

Honours

Club
Quảng Nam
 V.League 1: 2017

References 

1987 births
Living people
Vietnamese footballers
Association football defenders
V.League 1 players
SHB Da Nang FC players
Quang Nam FC players